Musquash is a civil parish in Saint John County, New Brunswick, Canada.

For governance purposes it forms the local service district of the parish of Musquash, which is a member of the Fundy Regional Service Commission (FRSC).

Origin of name
The Provincial Archives of New Brunswick gives it origin as "derived from the Maliseet word for muskrat" but does not mention that word or give a source.

William F. Ganong has entries for Musquash Islands and Musquash Harbour, the former translated from the French I. aux Rats musquez, island of muskrats, the latter uncertain, both possibly related to Maliseet words. 

Musquash is a synonym of muskrat, possibly borrowed from Massachusett.

History
Musquash was erected in 1877 from Lancaster Parish.

Boundaries
Musquash Parish is bounded:

 on the north by the Kings County line;
 on the east by the City of Saint John;
 on the south by the Bay of Fundy;
 on the west by the Charlotte County line.

Communities
Communities at least partly within the parish.

 Chance Harbour
 Dipper Harbour East
 Dipper Harbour West
 Five Fathom Hole
 Gooseberry Cove
 Little Lepreau
 Musquash
 Prince of Wales
 South Musquash

Bodies of water
Bodies of water at least partly within the parish.

 Little Lepreau River
 West Branch Musquash River
 Belvidere Stream
 Deer Lake Stream
 Fishing Stream
 Hanson Stream
 Menzies Stream
 Dipper Harbour Creek
 Ferguson Creek
 Goose Creek
 McLaughlin Creek
 Moose Creek
 Wetmore Creek
 West Branch Reservoir
 Back Channel
 The Narrows
 Bay of Fundy
 Plumper Hole
 Maces Bay
 Chance Harbour
 Dipper Harbour
 Little Dipper Harbour
 Musquash Harbour
 Hepburn Basin
 Bonny Doone Lake
 more than twenty other officially named lakes

Islands
Islands at least partly within the parish.

 Gooseberry Island
 Musquash Island
 Stillwater Island
 Man Rock
 Musquash Ledges
 Pork Ledge

Other notable places
Parks, historic sites, and other noteworthy places at least partly within the parish.
 Dipper Harbour Back Cove Protected Natural Area
 Gooseberry Cove Protected Natural Area
 Loch Alva Protected Natural Area
 Log Falls Dam
 Musquash Estuary Protected Natural Area
 Point Lepreau
 Round Meadow Cove Protected Natural Area

Demographics

Population
Population trend

Language
Mother tongue (2016)

Access Routes
Highways and numbered routes that run through the parish, including external routes that start or finish at the parish limits:

Highways

Principal Routes

Secondary Routes:

External Routes:
None

See also
List of parishes in New Brunswick

Notes

References

Parishes of Saint John County, New Brunswick
Local service districts of Saint John County, New Brunswick